Chertanovskaya is a station on the Serpukhovsko-Timiryazevskaya Line of the Moscow Metro. It was designed by architect Nina Alyoshina and opened in 1983.

Gallery

References

Moscow Metro stations
Serpukhovsko-Timiryazevskaya Line
Railway stations located underground in Russia